An adventure playground is a specific type of playground for children.  Adventure playgrounds can take many forms, ranging from "natural playgrounds" to "junk playgrounds", and are typically defined by an ethos of unrestricted play, the presence of playworkers (or "wardens"), and the absence of adult-manufactured or rigid play-structures.  Adventure playgrounds are frequently defined in contrast to playing fields, contemporary-design playgrounds made by adult architects, and traditional-equipment play areas containing adult-made rigid play-structures like swings, slides, seesaws, and climbing bars.

History 
Harry Shier, in Adventure Playgrounds: An Introduction (1984), defines an adventure playground this way:

The first planned playground of this type, the Emdrup Junk Playground, opened in Emdrup, Denmark, in 1943. In 1948, an adventure playground opened in Camberwell, England.  The term "junk playground" is a  calque from the Danish term skrammellegeplads. Early examples of adventure playgrounds in the UK were known as "junk playgrounds", "waste material playgrounds", or "bomb-site adventure playgrounds".  The term "adventure playground" was first adopted in the United Kingdom to describe waste material playgrounds "in an effort to make the ‘junk’ playground concept more palatable to local authorities".

The architect Simon Nicholson numbered among the advantages of the adventure playground, "the relationship between experiment and play, community involvement, the catalytic value of play leaders, and indeed the whole concept of a free society in miniature.'" Essential in this for Nicholson was the concept of 'loose parts':  "In any environment, both the degree of inventiveness and creativity, and the possibility of discovery, are directly proportional to the number and kind of variables in it." In a playground context loose parts would include:
 natural resources – such as straw, mud and pine cones
 building materials and tools – planks, nails, hammers
 scrap materials – old tyres, off-cuts of guttering
 bark which can be both safe playground surfacing and a loose part
 and, most essentially, random found objects.

Denmark
The first junk playgrounds were based on the ideas of Carl Theodor Sørensen, a Danish landscape architect, who noticed that children preferred to play everywhere but in the playgrounds that he designed. In 1931, inspired by the sight of children playing in a construction site, he imagined "A junk playground in which children could create and shape, dream and imagine a reality". His aim was to provide children living in cities the same opportunities for play that were enjoyed by children living in rural areas.  The first adventure playground was set up by a Workers Cooperative Housing Association in Emdrup, Denmark, during the German occupation of the 1940s.  The playground at Emdrup grew out of the spirit of resistance to Nazi occupation and parents' fears that "their children's play might be mistaken for acts of sabotage by soldiers".  Play advocates sometimes emphasize the importance of adventure playgrounds for children of color in the United States, where policing "can feel like a kind of occupation".

The UK
Marjory Allen, an English landscape architect and child welfare advocate, visited and subsequently wrote a widely-read article about the Emdrup Adventure playground titled Why Not Use Our Bomb Sites Like This? and published in the Picture Post in 1946.  While Marjory Allen's article is often credited with the introduction into the UK of "the idea of transforming bomb sites into 'junk playgrounds', historians of the Adventure playground movement have pointed to the role played by other experiments carried out by youth workers in the UK. For example, "Marie Paneth, an art therapist heavily influenced by Freud, independently developed the concept of permissive play as a tool for ameliorating childhood aggression in her work running a blitz-era play centre in London although not specifically incorporating the elements of a Junk/Adventure playground pointing to her role in the history of UK specific Playwork development."

List of adventure playgrounds 
To date, there are approximately 1,000 adventure playgrounds in Europe, most of them in England, Denmark, France, Germany, The Netherlands and Switzerland. Japan also has a significant number of adventure playgrounds.

The Americas  

Canada
TELUS Spark, in Calgary, Alberta has a Junkyard Playground open in the summer months.
The city of Calgary, in Alberta, Canada, piloted a mobile adventure playground in five city parks during the summer of 2016.
 Toronto Ontario hosted an Adventure Playground from 1974 until the mid-1980s. It was a part of the revitalization of the waterfront called Harbourfront Centre.
The City of Coquitlam in British Columbia created an Adventure Playground in the summer of 2018 as a pilot project.

United States
 The Yard (The first adventure playground in the United States)
 Adventure Playground in Berkeley, California
 Huntington Beach Adventure Playground in Huntington Beach, California
 Adventure Playground in Irvine, California
 Sacramento Adventure Playground in Sacramento, California

 The Hands-on-Nature Anarchy Zone in the Ithaca Children's Garden, Ithaca, NY 

 Adventure Playground at The Parish School in Houston, Texas
 Play:groundNYC on Governors Island in New York City.
SCV Adventure Play Foundation in Val Verde, CA.

Asia 

Japan
  The Setagaya Play Park or "Junk Playground" in Hanegi Park in  Setagaya ward, Tokyo, Japan.
  Children’s Dream Park 川崎市子ども夢パーク (or "Yume Park") in Shimosakunobe, Kawasaki Takatsu Ward, Kanagawa Prefecture, Japan.

Australia 

 The Venny, Kensington Adventure Playground. Kensington, Victoria.

Europe 
Denmark
Denmark has several adventure playgrounds, now known as Byggelegeplads (Building-playground) and formerly as Skrammellegeplads (Junk-playground). From the first site in Emdrup, the idea spread across the country and at the height of the popularity in the 1960s, there were about 100 adventure playgrounds in the country. Present active adventure playgrounds in Denmark includes:

 Skrammellegepladsen in Emdrup, Copenhagen.
 Bredegrund Byggelegeplads on Amager, Copenhagen.
 Remiseparken, on Amager next to Bredegrund.
 Regnbuen in Hvidovre a suburb of Copenhagen.
 Rødovre Byggelegeplads in Rødovre a suburb of Copenhagen.
 Byggelegepladsen Broparken, Rødovre.
 Byggelegepladsen Rønneholm, Rødovre.
 Højkjær Byggelegeplads in Brøndby a suburb of Copenhagen.
 Skolemarken in Aarhus.
 Søndergård in Lystrup a suburb of Aarhus.

Germany
 Abenteuerspielplätze und Kinderbauernhöfe in Berlin, or AKiB for short, is a federation of adventure playgrounds and children's farms in Berlin, Germany

Sweden
 St Hans bygglekplats in Lund
 Borgarparkens bygglekplats in Lund
 Klostergårdens bygglekplats in Lund

Switzerland
 Robi-Spiel Aktionen—An organization of adventure playgrounds in Basel, Switzerland

United Kingdom
 Camberwell, England
 Eccleshill Adventure Playground, also known as The Big Swing (Bradford, England)
 Evergreen Adventure Playground, Dalston, London
 Lockleaze Adventure Playground, Bristol, UK.
 Felix Road Adventure Playground, Bristol, UK.
 St Paul's Adventure Playground, Bristol, UK.
 The Land (Adventure playground) in Wrexham, Wales, UK
 The Triangle Adventure Playground in Oval, South London. London's oldest adventure playground still located on its original site.
 Meriden Adventure Playground Solihull, West Midlands
 Glamis Adventure Playground Tower Hamlets, London

Literature 
 C. Th. Sørensen (1931): "Parkpolitik i Sogn og Købstad", 
 "Risk and Safety in Play: The law and practice for adventure playgrounds (2003)"
 Joan Almon, Editor. (2017) Playing It Up—With Loose Parts, Playpods, and Adventure Playgrounds, Annapolis, MD: Alliance for Childhood.
 Mike Lanza (2012): "Playborhood: Turn Your Neighborhood Into a Place for Play", Free Play Press

Academic
 BDJA: Adventure playgrounds and city farms in Europe and what they contribute to sustainable urban development, a study from Germany
 
 Leichter-Saxby, Morgan  (2007)  Constructing the “Natural” Child: The Materiality of Play, Power and Subversion at Evergreen Adventure Playground.  M.A. thesis, University of London.  Retrieved 22 January 2017.
 Sutton, Lia (2005): Kinderparadijs (Children's Paradise): Advancing the Adventure Playground Movement, a student's thesis (Hampshire College, Massachusetts)
 Wilson, Reilly Bergin (2014) Who Owns the Playground: Space and Power at Lollard Adventure Playground (1954-1961).  M.A. thesis, University of Leeds.

Film 
 Erin Davis (2015): The Land
 British Pathé (1950-1959): Come Out To Play Reel 2 1950-1959 includes a "junk playground" sequence.
 William H. Whyte (1980): The Social Life of Small Urban Spaces includes a "junk playground" sequence.
 Alliance for Childhood - play:ground NYC

Arts and Theatre
 Junkyard (musical) written by Jack Thorne about Lockleaze Adventure playground (or ‘The Vench') in Bristol.

See also 
Children's street culture
Home zone/Play street
 Playwork
 Pop-Up Adventure Play
 Sudbury School
 Tinkering School
 Makerspaces
 Free-range parenting
 Forest kindergarten
 Lady Allen of Hurtwood

Notes

References

External links 
 The Overprotected Kid, The Atlantic, 2014
 Inside a European Adventure Playground, The Atlantic, 2014
 Where the wild things play, NPR, 2014
 Play Wales, the national charity for children's play.
 Adventure Playground: A Parable of Anarchy

 
Environmental education
Playgrounds